Jay LaDue (April 7, 1827 – October 12, 1926) was an American farmer and politician.

LaDue was born in Sherman, Chautauqua County, New York. He went to the public schools. In 1856, LaDue moved to Luverne, Rock County, Minnesota with his wife and family and was a farmer. LaDue served in the Minnesota Senate from 1891 to 1894.

References

1827 births
1926 deaths
People from Chautauqua County, New York
People from Luverne, Minnesota
Farmers from Minnesota
Minnesota state senators